The 2004 European Canoe Slalom Championships took place in Skopje, Macedonia between June 4 and 6, 2004 under the auspices of the European Canoe Association (ECA). It was the 5th edition. The competitors took part in 8 events, but medals were awarded for only 6 of them. The C2 team event and the K1 women's team event only had 4 teams participating. An event must have at least 5 nations taking part in order to count as a medal event.

Medal summary

Men's results

Canoe

Kayak

Women's results

Kayak

Medal table

References

 Official results
 European Canoe Association

European Canoe Slalom Championships
European Canoe Slalom Championships
European Canoe Slalom Championships
Sports competitions in Skopje
European Canoe Slalom Championships, 2004
Canoeing in North Macedonia
International sports competitions hosted by North Macedonia
European Canoe Slalom Championships